Bohok is a small village in the county of Kronoberg in Småland, Sweden. Approximately 5 people live in Bohok on a permanent basis whilst there are some more 10 persons living in Bohok during June–August.

Populated places in Kronoberg County